Národní třída ("Avenue of the Nation") is a Prague Metro station on Line B. The station has two exits, one to Spálená street where it connects to the tram network and other to M. D. Rettigové street, using a pair of lifts. The station was opened on 2 November 1985, as part of the inaugural section of Line B between Sokolovská and Smíchovské nádraží.

The station was closed between July 2012 and June 2014 due to construction of a new shopping and business centre called Quadrio. Trains only passed through the station without stopping.

Characteristics 
Národní třída is a pylon type metro station with three supports.

References

See also 
 Národní třída

Prague Metro stations
Railway stations opened in 1985
1985 establishments in Czechoslovakia
Railway stations in the Czech Republic opened in the 20th century